Isoceras huberi is a moth in the family Cossidae. It was described by Ulf Eitschberger and Manfred Ströhle in 1987. It is found in Turkey, Armenia and Transcaucasia (Georgia and Azerbaijan).

References

Cossinae
Moths described in 1987
Moths of Europe
Moths of Asia